Som Dutt is an Indian politician and is member of the Fifth and Sixth Legislative Assembly of Delhi. He is a member of the Aam Aadmi Party and represents Sadar Bazar (Assembly constituency) of Delhi.

Member of Legislative Assembly (2020 - present)
Since 2020, he is an elected member of the 7th Delhi Assembly.

Committee assignments of Delhi Legislative Assembly
 Member (2022-2023), Public Accounts Committee

Electoral performance

References 
 

Living people
Delhi MLAs 2013–2015
Delhi MLAs 2015–2020
Delhi MLAs 2020–2025
Aam Aadmi Party MLAs from Delhi
1977 births